National Velvet is a 1944 American Technicolor sports film directed by Clarence Brown and based on the 1935 novel of the same name by Enid Bagnold. It stars  Mickey Rooney,  Donald Crisp, Angela Lansbury, Anne Revere, Reginald Owen, and an adolescent Elizabeth Taylor.

In 2003, National Velvet was selected for preservation in the United States National Film Registry by the Library of Congress as being "culturally, historically, or aesthetically significant."

Plot

Velvet Brown, a twelve-year-old horse-crazy girl, lives with her family in Sewels, a small village in Sussex, England. After winning a spirited gelding in a raffle, she dreams of training him for the Grand National steeplechase. Penniless young drifter, Mi Taylor, who discovered Mrs. Brown's name and address among his late father's effects, arrives at the Brown farm. Hoping to somehow profit from the association, Mi accepts an invitation to dinner and a night's lodging at the Browns' home. Mrs Brown is unwilling to allow Mi to trade on his father's good name and remains vague about their connection. Nevertheless, she convinces her husband to hire Mi as a store helper, over his better judgment. It is eventually revealed that Mi's career as a steeplechase jockey ended in a collision which resulted in another jockey's death. The accident left Mi fearing riding and hating horses.

Velvet calls her horse "The Pie" because his previous owner called the troublesome gelding a pirate. Seeing Pie's natural talent, Velvet pleads with Mi to train him for the Grand National. Mi believes it a fool's errand, not because the horse lacks ability, but because they are unable to finance the effort. He makes his case to Mrs. Brown, but she consents to Velvet's desire to train the horse. To cover the entrance fee and other costs, Mrs. Brown gives Velvet the prize money she won for swimming the English Channel. Velvet and Mi train Pie and enter him into the race.

Mi and Velvet travel to the Grand National. Mi hires a professional jockey, but the night before the race, Velvet senses he lacks faith in the Pie and will lose. Velvet dismisses the jockey, leaving them without a rider. That night, Mi overcomes his fear of riding and intends to race Pie himself only to discovers Velvet wearing the jockey silks and intending to ride. Knowing the dangers, Mi attempts to dissuade Velvet, who is determined to ride. As the race unfolds, Velvet and Pie clear all hurdles and win the race. Elated but exhausted, Velvet falls off her mount just after the finish. However, Velvet and Pie and disqualified for violating the rule requiring the winning jockey not to dismount before reaching the enclosure.  

When it is discovered that the jockey is a girl, Velvet becomes a media sensation and receives lucrative offers to travel to Hollywood and be filmed with Pie. To her father's disappointment, Velvet tearfully declines all offers, claiming that Pie would not understand the intense scrutiny. Velvet says that she raced Pie at the Grand National because he deserved a chance for greatness. Velvet chooses a normal life for her and her horse. At the close of the film, Mi, ready to resume his old life, takes his leave without bidding Velvet goodbye. Velvet is heartbroken, but Mrs Brown says it was time for him to resume his old life. She gives Velvet permission to tell Mi that his father coached Mrs Brown to swim the English Channel. Astride Pie, Velvet catches Mi at the top of a hill against a sunset sky, where she tells him about his father.

Cast

Production notes
An 18-year-old Gene Tierney, who was then appearing on Broadway, was offered the role of Velvet Brown in 1939. Production was delayed, however, so Tierney returned to Broadway. Much of the film was shot in Pebble Beach, California, with the most-scenic views on the Pebble Beach Golf Links (with golf holes visible in the background). Elizabeth Taylor was given "The Pie" as a birthday gift after filming was over.

This was the first of two films casting Elizabeth Taylor and Anne Revere. The other film, A Place in the Sun, featured Revere as the mother of Taylor's love interest, played by Montgomery Clift. In that film, however, the two actresses never shared the screen with each other in any scene.

Mickey Rooney's scenes were shot first in one month allotted by the U.S. Army before Rooney was inducted in June 1944.

Mickey Rooney played a similar role in the film Black Stallion (1979).

Differences from the book
The screenplay was written by Helen Deutsch. The film differs from the book in a number of respects. For example, Velvet's horse in the book is a piebald, and thus is given the name "The Piebald" or "The Pie" for short. In the movie, Pie is a chestnut, and another explanation for his name was given. Velvet, in the book, is a sickly child who is given to great imagination and spirit; her father is stern and given to anger, but the mother is stronger still and stands up to him. Since her days as a swimmer, she has become a large woman and weighs 16 stone— at the time of the story, and warns Velvet never to allow herself to be burdened by weight. In the book Mr. and Mrs. Brown also have a 15-year-old daughter named Meredith, in addition to Edwina, Malvolia, Velvet, and Donald. In the novel, the professional jockey hired by Mi to race at the Grand National is said to have finished in 4th place at the previous event, it is possible this character is a reference to 1932 Ascot Gold Cup disgraced competitor Arthur Pasquier.  The Meredith character does not appear in the movie.

Song
 "Summertime" - Elizabeth Taylor, Angela Lansbury, Juanita Quigley, MGM Studio and Orchestra Chorus Girls, and Norma Varden

Reception
National Velvet holds a 100% 'Fresh' rating on Rotten Tomatoes based on 26 reviews, with an average rating of 8.09/10. The site's consensus reads: "National Velvet makes the most of a breakout performance from Elizabeth Taylor, delivering a timeless family-friendly tearjerker that avoids straying into the sentimental".

At the box office, the film earned $3,678,000 in the US and Canada and $2,162,000 elsewhere.

Academy Awards
The film won two Oscars, and was nominated for three others, in 1945:

Other adaptations
 National Velvet was dramatized as a one-hour radio play on the February 3, 1947 broadcast of Lux Radio Theater, with Elizabeth Taylor, Mickey Rooney, Donald Crisp and Janice Scott.
 In 1960, the film was adapted into a television series with the same title.

Sequel
In 1978, the sequel International Velvet was released. The film stars Tatum O'Neal, Christopher Plummer, Anthony Hopkins, and Nanette Newman, who plays Velvet Brown as an adult. After the events of National Velvet, Donald got married, had a daughter named Sarah Velvet Brown, and moved from England to Cave Creek, Arizona. Sarah comes to live with Velvet and her boyfriend John after Donald and his wife die from their injuries in a car accident. Elizabeth Taylor did not reprise her role as Velvet in the sequel.

References

External links

 
 
 
 
 

1944 films
American children's drama films
Films about women's sports
Films about horses
American horse racing films
Films adapted into television shows
Films based on British novels
Films set in England
Films set in Sussex
Films shot in California
Films featuring a Best Supporting Actress Academy Award-winning performance
Films whose editor won the Best Film Editing Academy Award
United States National Film Registry films
Metro-Goldwyn-Mayer films
Films produced by Pandro S. Berman
Films directed by Clarence Brown
Films scored by Herbert Stothart
1944 drama films
1940s English-language films
1940s American films